Ivan Iusco (born September 4, 1970) is an Italian award-winning composer and record producer based in Los Angeles, California, United States.

Career

Music
In 1987, he founded the pioneering Italian music label Minus Habens Records (involving artists such as Angelo Badalamenti, Brian Eno, Aphex Twin and Depeche Mode), through which he continues to explore and publish avant-garde and cutting-edge music. Several years later he established the Disturbance label to focus on ambient electronic and techno music.

In the late 1980s, Iusco founded the dark ambient and industrial music group, Nightmare Lodge, whose music was primarily released through Minus Habens. During the 1990s, Iusco recorded works under the name "It" and released the first album under that name, Era Vulgaris, on his Disturbance imprint in 1996.

Film soundtracks and scoring
He debuted in the film industry in 1999, having composed the music for the Apulian cult movie LaCapaGira directed by Alessandro Piva, and went on to win Best Soundtrack at the 2000 Valencia Film Festival (Spain). In 2003 he composed the music for Mio Cognato, a movie by the same director, for which he received the 2004 Nastro d'Argento nomination for Best Soundtrack.

Iusco has partnered often with the well-known Italian director, Sergio Rubini, composing the main theme for the movie L’Anima Gemella (2002), the soundtrack of L’Amore Ritorna (2004), and an additional score for Colpo D’Occhio (2008) which complemented the music of Pino Donaggio.

His scoring career also includes Ho Voglia Di Te (2007) by the Spanish director Luis Prieto; Fesibum / Maledetto Tag episode (2009) by Dino Giarrusso; 6 Sull’Autobus (2012) a project by Sergio Rubini produced by the Accademia Nazionale D’Arte Drammatica Silvio D’Amico (selected at the 69th Venice Film Festival); and Da Che Parte Stai (2016) by Francesco Lopez.

The track "Mobili In Mobilis", taken from his album Transients (2015), was nominated for the Best Instrumental Song by the American Songwriting Awards 2016.

His recent projects included the soundtrack for Rex Starlight, a TV series pilot by the American scriptwriter Daniel Greenspan and the joint projects with the Canadian artist Cassandra Cronenberg titled Mirror Drones and Between.

In 2020 he composed two original songs for Cyberpunk 2077, the long-awaited Sci-Fi video game starring Keanu Reeves.

Movie soundtracks

Videoart, short film and documentary soundtracks

Discography

Solo

With Nightmare Lodge

With Dive

As "It"

Official remixes

Awards and nominations
Outstanding Achievement Award (Original Somg) - “The Other Side” taken from the album “Synthagma” - IndieX Fest (Los Angeles), USA 2021
Best Music Video Nomination - “Falling (Andante)” taken from the album “Transients” - Los Angeles CineFest, USA 2017
Best Instrumental Track Nomination “ASA 2016” - “Mobilis In Mobili” taken from the album “Transients” - American Songwriting Awards, USA 2016
Best Composer Award “Ombre Sonore Del Mediterraneo” - Teca del Mediterraneo/Consiglio Regionale della Puglia, Italy 2009 
Best Original Soundtrack Nomination “Diamanti Al Cinema” - soundtrack of the movie “Ho Voglia Di Te” - Venice Film Festival, Italy 2007
Best Composer Special Award - Ragusa Film Festival, Italy 2004 
Best Original Soundtrack Nomination “Nastro d'Argento” (Silver Ribbon) - soundtrack of the movie “Mio Cognato” - Nastri d’Argento, Italy 2004 
Best Original Soundtrack Award - soundtrack of the movie “LaCapaGira” - Valencia Film Festival, Spain 2000

References

External links
 
 
 
 

1970 births
20th-century classical composers
Italian film score composers
Italian male film score composers
Living people
Virgin Records artists
People from Bari
20th-century Italian composers
20th-century Italian male musicians